Oreal Donald Perras (August 25, 1942 – February 18, 2017) was a Canadian professional wrestler, better known by the ring name "The Russian Bear" Ivan Koloff. He was the third wrestler to hold the WWWF Championship.

Early life 
Perras was born in Montreal, Quebec, Canada and raised on a dairy farm in rural Ontario along with his six brothers and three sisters.

Since first watching professional wrestling on TV at the age of eight, he wanted to become a wrestler, and would often wrestle with his brothers growing up. At age 18, he left high school and joined Jack Wentworth's wrestling school in Hamilton, Ontario, where he would lift weights and learn wrestling holds.

Professional wrestling career

Early career (1961–1967) 
Perras debuted as an Irish rogue villain character named Red McNulty, billed from Dublin, Ireland and wrestling with an eyepatch. For the next three years, he wrestled around the Toronto area, eventually quitting his regular job to wrestle in the north-western area of Canada. There, Perras acquired much wrestling experience, and from there he made his first trip to Japan.

The Russian Bear (1967–1994) 
In 1967, Perras became "The Russian Bear" Ivan Koloff, a bearded villainous character billed from Ukraine, and debuted with the International Wrestling Association in Montreal, Québec. He defeated Johnny Rougeau for the IWA International Heavyweight Championship the following year. Koloff debuted in the World Wide Wrestling Federation in late 1969, managed by "Captain" Lou Albano. He soon started a rivalry with then-WWWF World Heavyweight Champion Bruno Sammartino. On January 18, 1971, Koloff defeated Sammartino in Madison Square Garden for the WWWF World Heavyweight Championship by pinfall after a knee drop from the top rope, ending Sammartino's seven and two-thirds years reign. Koloff lost the championship 21 days later to Pedro Morales, essentially being used as a "transitional champion" to move the title from Sammartino to Morales without the two fan favorites working against each other, much like Stan Stasiak and The Iron Sheik would be in later years. After the loss, Koloff remained a contender for the title but never reclaimed it, leaving the WWWF in 1971.

During his time in the WWWF, Koloff weighing in at  wrestled WWWF World Heavyweight Championship title matches against Sammartino, Morales, Superstar Billy Graham and Bob Backlund, holding the distinction, with fellow villain Stan Stasiak, as one of only two men to challenge all four of these champions. Koloff would also be the first opponent to ever challenge for the WWWF World Heavyweight Championship in a steel cage match in a rematch loss against Sammartino. He fought in the WWWF from 1975 to 1976, 1978–1979 and 1983. During the 1970s and 1980s, Koloff found success in the National Wrestling Alliance, winning many regional tag team and singles titles in the Georgia, Florida, and Mid-Atlantic territories. In February 1981, he teamed with Ray Stevens to defeat Paul Jones and Masked Superstar to capture the NWA World Tag Team Championship. This would be the first of his four reigns as NWA World Tag Team Champion, later winning the belts with Don Kernodle and twice with his "nephew" (kayfabe), Nikita Koloff as The Russian Team.

The Russians (which also included Krusher Kruschev) were a top villainous group from 1984 to 1986, and Nikita, under Perras' training and mentoring, and by association, became a hated villain in his own right, and would go on to have a successful singles career of his own. After Nikita turned on Ivan to join their enemy Dusty Rhodes in 1986, the latter teamed with Vladimir Petrov and Dick Murdoch to get revenge. Koloff's biggest NWA feuds were against Rhodes, The Road Warriors, The Rock 'n' Roll Express (Ricky Morton and Robert Gibson) and Magnum T. A. In 1988, Koloff spent time in Paul Jones' faction, The Paul Jones Army, where he was a "coach" of sorts for The Powers of Pain, The Barbarian and The Warlord. He later split with Jones, reunited with Nikita, and feuded with Jones' team, The Russian Assassins, before leaving Jim Crockett Promotions in January 1989. In 1992, Koloff also wrestled in the first television main event of Jim Cornette's Smoky Mountain Wrestling, beating Bobby Fulton. He lost to Ron Garvin at Tim Horner's National Championship Wrestling on July 22, 1994. He retired afterwards.

Eastern Championship Wrestling (1992–1993) 
He also spent time in Eastern Championship Wrestling, appearing on the very first ECW card in 1992. In 1993 he began teaming with his storyline nephew Vladimir Koloff. The team won their debut match on the June 29 edition of ECW Hardcore TV. Koloff defeated The Sandman on the July 6, 1993, episode of ECW Hardcore TV in a number one contenders match for the ECW Heavyweight Championship.

Return to wrestling (2004–2013) 
In 2004, Koloff returned to the ring for the first time in 10 years. He wrestled in the independent circuit. On August 27, 2005, Koloff defeated Dominic DeNucci in a Russian chain match at WrestleReunion. Koloff would win his final wrestling title defeating The Barbarian in a Russian chain match for the Legends title at NWA Charlotte. On July 19, 2013, Koloff lost Shane Douglas in an Extreme Rules match at Mega Pro. His final match was against Bob Armstrong in which Armstrong won on November 16, 2013, at Superstars of Wrestling 1 in Rome, Georgia.

Personal life
Perras wrote a book titled Is That Wrestling Fake? The Bear Facts that was released on January 1, 2007. He became a born again Christian in 1995 and traveled to churches to share his testimony as an ordained minister. Koloff spoke openly and candidly of his conversion to Christianity and struggles with alcohol and drugs and the crazy days of wrestling in his 2014 book, Life in the Trenches. Perras was named as a defendant in a 2015 lawsuit filed by WWE after they received a letter from him indicating that he intended to sue them for concussion-based injuries sustained during his tenure with them. He was represented by attorney Konstantine Kyros, who is involved in several other lawsuits involving former WWE wrestlers. The lawsuit was dismissed in September 2018.

Death
Perras died at his home in Winterville, North Carolina, on February 18, 2017, from liver cancer.

Other media 
Koloff is featured as a playable character in the video games Legends of Wrestling, Legends of Wrestling II and Showdown: Legends of Wrestling.

Championships and accomplishments 
 American Championship Wrestling
 ACW United States Championship (1 time)
 Atlantic Coast Wrestling
 ACW Tag Team Championship (1 time) – with Vladimir Koloff
 Cauliflower Alley Club
 Iron Mike Mazurki Award (2013)
 Championship Wrestling from Florida
 NWA Florida Tag Team Championship (5 times) – with Pat Patterson (1), Masa Saito (3), and Nikolai Volkoff (1)
 NWA Southern Heavyweight Championship (Florida version) (1 time)
 Coastal Real Extreme Wrestling
 CREW Heavyweight Championship (1 time)
 CWF Mid-Atlantic
 CWF Mid-Atlantic Tag Team Championship (1 time) – with Sean Powers
George Tragos/Lou Thesz Professional Wrestling Hall of Fame
 Frank Gotch Award (2009)
 Georgia Championship Wrestling
 NWA Georgia Tag Team Championship (7 times) – with Ole Anderson (5), and Alexis Smirnoff (2)
 Great Lakes Wrestling Association
 GLWA United States Heavyweight Championship (1 time)
High Volume Pro Wrestling
HVPW Hall of Fame (2014)
 International Wrestling Alliance
 IWA World Tag Team Championship (1 time) – with Maurice Vachon
 International Wrestling Association (Montreal)
 IWA International Heavyweight Championship (1 time)
 Maple Leaf Wrestling
 NWA Canadian Heavyweight Championship (Toronto version) (1 time)
 NWA Television Championship (Toronto version) (2 times)
 Masterz of Mayhem
 MoM USWA North American Heavyweight Championship (1 time)
 Mid-Atlantic Championship Wrestling/Jim Crockett Promotions
 NWA Mid-Atlantic Heavyweight Championship (3 times)
 NWA Mid-Atlantic Tag Team Championship (1 time) – with Don Kernodle
 NWA Mid-Atlantic Television Championship (2 times)
 NWA Television Championship (3 times)
 NWA United States Tag Team Championship (2 times) – with Krusher Khruschev (1), Dick Murdoch (1)
 NWA World Six-Man Tag Team Championship (2 times) – with Nikita Koloff and Krusher Khruschev (Baron von Raschke with Krusher injured) (1), The Barbarian and The Warlord (1)
 NWA World Tag Team Championship (Mid Atlantic version) (5 times) – with Nikita Koloff (1), Nikita Koloff and Krusher Khruschev (1), Ray Stevens (1), Don Kernodle (1), and Manny Fernandez (1) (substituting for Rick Rude who had left for the WWF
NWA United States Tag Team Championship Tournament (1986) – with Krusher Khruschev
 Mid-Atlantic Wrestling Alliance
 MAWA Heavyweight Championship (1 time)
 NWA Charlotte
 NWA Charlotte Legends Championship (1 time)
 Professional Wrestling Hall of Fame and Museum
 (Class of 2011)
 Southern Championship Wrestling
 SCW Hall of Fame (Class of 1999)
 Virginia Wrestling Association
 VWA Heavyweight Championship (1 time)
 Western Ohio Wrestling
 WOW International Heavyweight Championship (1 time)
 World Wide Wrestling Federation
 WWWF World Heavyweight Championship (1 time)
 World Wrestling Association
 WWA World Heavyweight Championship (1 time)
 World Wrestling Council
 WWC Puerto Rico Heavyweight Championship (1 time)
 Wrestling Observer Newsletter
 Wrestling Observer Newsletter Hall of Fame (Class of 2015)

References

Further reading
 Wrestling With God, Chad Bonham, 2001, pp. 179–197.

External links 
 
 
 

1942 births
2017 deaths
Canadian Christians
Canadian evangelicals
Canadian male professional wrestlers
Deaths from cancer in North Carolina
Deaths from liver cancer
Faux Russian professional wrestlers
NWA/WCW World Television Champions
People from Winterville, North Carolina
Professional Wrestling Hall of Fame and Museum
Professional wrestling managers and valets
Professional wrestling trainers
WWE Champions
20th-century professional wrestlers
21st-century professional wrestlers
WWC Puerto Rico Champions
NWA Florida Tag Team Champions
NWA Southern Heavyweight Champions (Florida version)
Professional wrestlers from Montreal
NWA Canadian Heavyweight Champions
WCW World Tag Team Champions
NWA/WCW United States Tag Team Champions
NWA Georgia Tag Team Champions